Vantage Press was a self-publishing company based in the United States. The company was founded in 1949 and ceased operations in late 2012.

Vantage was the largest vanity press in the United States. By 1956, they were publishing hundreds of titles per year. By 1958, they were facing legal problems, as the Federal Trade Commission raised charges regarding their use of the term "cooperative" to explain their business model, when the author was actually paying all of the costs. In 1990, the State Supreme Court in New York ordered Vantage to pay $3.5 million in damages to 2,200 authors it had defrauded. According to the plaintiffs, Vantage charged money upfront, but never promoted the books as the authors had expected.

References

Self-publishing companies
Book publishing companies of the United States
Publishing companies established in 1949
Companies disestablished in 2012
Defunct companies based in Massachusetts
1949 establishments in New York (state)
2012 disestablishments in Massachusetts